Crocus chrysanthus, the snow crocus or golden crocus, is a species of flowering plant of the Crocus genus in the family Iridaceae. Native to the Balkans and Turkey, it bears vivid orange-yellow bowl-shaped flowers. It has smaller corms and a smaller flower than the giant Dutch crocus (Crocus vernus), although it produces more flowers per corm than the latter. Its common name, "snow crocus", derives from its exceptionally early flowering period, blooming about two weeks before the giant crocus, and often emerging through the snow in late winter or early spring. The leaves are narrow with a silver central stripe. Height: .

The Latin specific epithet chrysanthus means "golden-flowered".

Cultivars
Crocus chrysanthus cultivars are selections from Crocus chrysanthus and hybrids of this species with several subspecies of Crocus biflorus and Crocus aerius. Yellow cultivars are selections of Crocus chrysanthus. Blue and white cultivars are hybrids or selections close to Crocus biflorus.

An intensive hybridisation and selection programme was initiated by Jan Hoog (Van Tubergen nursery) and E.A. Bowles involving crosses between C. chrysanthus and a number of forms of C. biflorus; the results with larger flowers and usually flower markings and colors were named.

Several of their numerous selections are still available. Examples: 
 'Advance': inside yellow, outside violet-blue
 'Ard Schenk': white with bronze throat 
 'Blue Pearl': pale lavender or lobelia-blue with a bronze-yellow throat and base; rich blue tepal backs, paler within and with a yellow basal blotch
 'Blue Peter': midnight blue outside, palest blue within
 'Cream Beauty': creamy yellow with bronze throat
 'Goldilocks': butter yellow with bronze feathering
 'Ladykiller' Pale lilac-white interior and deep purple-violet exterior with white margins
 'Prince Claus': white, blue flash on exterior
 'Romance': inside creamy, outside blueish
 'Saturnus': yellow inside, dark purple outside
 'Skyline': inside light blue, outside bright blue
 'Snow Bunting': white inside, outside creamy white with lilac feathering; bronze throat
 'Zwanenburg Bronze': gold yellow, outside bronze

Those cultivars marked  have gained the Royal Horticultural Society's Award of Garden Merit.

References

External links
 
 The Plant Expert
 RHS Plant Selector
 Paghat's Garden
 Pacific Bulb Society
 Missouri Botanical Garden

chrysanthus
Garden plants
Flora of Southeastern Europe
Plants described in 1841